Narayan Govind Chapekar (Devanagari: नारायण गोविंद चापेकर; 1869–1968) was a Marathi writer from Maharashtra, India.

He was the editor of Maharashtra Sahitya Patrika (महाराष्ट्र साहित्यपत्रिका).

He wrote many articles on noted persons in Vedic literature.

After having attained his BA & LL.B degrees from University Of Bombay he practised law for some time and then joined judiciary and eventually retired as First Class sub-judge. He then joined the judiciary in the Indian state of Aundh near Satara in now Maharashtra State as chief justice. It has been said that he vastly improved the judicial system there and brought it at par with the judicial system in British India.

The British had honoured him with the title of Diwan Bahadur which was customarily given to a judge who had the rank of First Class Sub Judge.

His literary works include the following:
 Peshwaichya Sawalit (पेशवाईच्या सावलीत) (1937)
 "Chiplonkar Yanche Jamakharch" (चिपळूणकर यांचे जमाखर्च)
 Chitpawan (चित्पावन)
 He also published his autobiography

Chapekar presided over Marathi Sahitya Sammelan held in Baroda in 1934.

References

1869 births
1968 deaths
Chapekar, Narayan Govind
20th-century Indian biographers
Indian autobiographers
Presidents of the Akhil Bharatiya Marathi Sahitya Sammelan